This is a list of Malaysian football transfers for the 2019 first transfer window. Only transfers featuring Malaysia Super League and Malaysia Premier League are listed. For the Malaysia M3 League featured for selected clubs only.

The transfer window opened 29 November 2018 and closed 20 February 2019.

Malaysia Super League
Note: Flags indicate national team as has been defined under FIFA eligibility rules. Players may hold more than one non-FIFA nationality.

Felda United

In:

Out:

Johor Darul Ta'zim

In:

Out:

Kedah

In:

Out:

Kuala Lumpur

In:

Out:

Melaka United

In:

Out:

Pahang

In:

Out:

Perak

In:

Out:

Petaling Jaya City

In:

Out:

PKNP

In:

Out:

PKNS

In:

Out:

Selangor

In:

Out:

Terengganu

In:

Out:

Malaysia Premier League

Johor Darul Ta'zim II

In:

Out:

Kelantan

In:

Out:

Negeri Sembilan

In:

Out:

PDRM

In:

Out:

Penang

In:

Out:

Sabah

In:

Out:

Sarawak

In:

Out:

Selangor United

In:

Out:

Terengganu II

In:

Out:

UiTM

In:

Out:

UKM

In:

Out:

Malaysia M3 League

Kelantan United

In:

Out:

References

2019
Tranfers
Malaysia